Sucrase is a digestive enzyme that catalyzes the hydrolysis of sucrose to its subunits fructose and glucose. One form, sucrase-isomaltase, is secreted in the small intestine on the brush border. The sucrase enzyme invertase, which occurs more commonly in plants, also hydrolyzes sucrose but by a different mechanism.

Types
  is isomaltase
  is invertase
  is sucrose alpha-glucosidase

Physiology
Sucrose intolerance (also known as congenital sucrase-isomaltase deficiency (CSID), genetic sucrase-isomaltase deficiency (GSID), or sucrase-isomaltase deficiency) occurs when sucrase is not being secreted in the small intestine. With sucrose intolerance, the result of consuming sucrose is excess gas production and often diarrhea and malabsorption. Lactose intolerance is a related disorder that reflects an individual's inability to hydrolyze the disaccharide lactose.

Sucrase is secreted by the tips of the villi of the epithelium in the small intestine. Its levels are reduced in response to villi-blunting events such as celiac sprue and the inflammation associated with the disorder. The levels increase in pregnancy, lactation, and diabetes as the villi hypertrophy.

Use in chemical analysis
Sucrose is a non-reducing sugar, so will not test positive with Benedict's solution. To test for sucrose, the sample is treated with sucrase. The sucrose is hydrolysed into glucose and fructose, with glucose being a reducing sugar, which in turn tests positive with Benedict's solution..

In other species
Cedar waxwings (Bombycilla cedrorum) and American robins (Turdus migratorius) have evolved to lose this enzyme due to their insectivorous and frugivorous diets. This absence produces digestive difficulty if challenged with unusual amounts of the sugar.

References

External links
 

EC 3.2.1
E-number additives

de:Saccharase